Phellodon rufipes is a species of tooth fungus in the family Bankeraceae. It was described as new to science in 1971 by Dutch mycologist Rudolph Arnold Maas Geesteranus, from collections made in Japan.

References

External links

Fungi described in 1971
Fungi of Japan
Inedible fungi
rufipes